

A
Dunc Annan

B
Johnny Barrett,
Sid Bennett,
John Bosdett,
Garland Buckeye

C
Ralph Capron

D
Ben Derr,
Paul Des Jardien

E
Alfred Eissler

F
Guil Falcon,
Dick Falcon

G
Milt Ghee

K
Emmett Keefe,
Oscar Knop

M
Grover Malone,
Neil Mathews,
Jack Meagher,
Jock Mungavin

P
Dick Pierce

R
Lew Reeve,
Frank Rydzewski

V
Walter Voight,
Pete Volz

References
Pro Football Reference Chicago Tigers Roster

 
Chicago T